Feroniascus is a genus of beetles in the family Carabidae, containing the following species:

 Feroniascus ambitiosus Basilewsky, 1985
 Feroniascus catalai (Jeannel, 1948)
 Feroniascus chlaenioides Jeannel, 1951
 Feroniascus vadoni Jeannel, 1951

References

Platyninae